Violin Concerto No. 1 may refer to any composer's first violin concerto, or to a composer's only violin concerto:

Violin Concerto in A minor (Bach)
Violin Concerto (Barber) 
Violin Concerto No. 1 (Bartók) 
Violin Concerto (Beethoven) in D major
Violin Concerto (Berg)
Violin Concerto (Brahms) in D major
Violin Concerto No. 1 (Bruch) in G minor
Violin Concerto No. 1 (Davies)
Violin Concerto (Dvořák) in A minor
Violin Concerto (Elgar) in B minor
Violin Concerto No. 1 (Glass)
Violin Concerto No. 1 (Goldmark) in A minor
Violin Concerto No. 1 (Haydn) in C major
Violin Concerto No. 1 (Lindberg)
Violin Concerto (Mendelssohn) in E minor
Violin Concerto No. 1 (Mozart) in B-flat major
Violin Concerto No. 1 (Paganini) in D major
Violin Concerto No. 1 (Piston)
Violin Concerto No. 1 (Prokofiev) in D major
Violin Concerto No. 1 (Saint-Saëns) in A major by Camille Saint-Saëns
Violin Concerto (Schoenberg)
Violin Concerto (Schumann) in D minor
Violin Concerto No. 1 (Shostakovich) in A minor
Violin Concerto (Sibelius) in D minor
Violin Concerto No. 1 (Szymanowski) (atonal)
Violin Concerto (Tchaikovsky) in D major
Violin Concerto No. 1 (Vieuxtemps) in E major by Henri Vieuxtemps
Violin Concerto No. 1 (Wieniawski) in F-sharp minor

See also 
Violin concerto
List of compositions for violin and orchestra